Lobocheilos terminalis is a species of cyprinid in the genus Lobocheilos.

References

Cyprinidae
Cyprinid fish of Asia
Fish of Malaysia